Choapa may refer to
 Choapa River, a river of Chile located in the Coquimbo Region.
 Choapa Province, one of the provinces making up the Coquimbo Region of Chile.

See also 
 Las Choapas, Veracruz
 Las Choapas (archaeological site)